Oleg Flentea (born 6 August 1964) is a former Moldovan footballer who played as midfielder.

Honours

Club
Nistru Chișinău
Soviet First League
Runner-up: 1982

Soviet Second League B
Third Place: 1991 (V Zone — Center)

Individual
Constructorul Chișinău
Divizia Națională Top scorer: 1992 (13 goals; shared with Serghei Alexandrov)

References

External links
 

1964 births
Living people
People from Bender, Moldova
Moldovan footballers
Moldovan Super Liga players
FC Zimbru Chișinău players
CS Petrocub Hîncești players
FC Tighina players

Association football midfielders